Henry Foster may refer to:

Politicians
Henry A. Foster (1800–1889), American politician from New York
Henry Donnel Foster (1808–1880), American politician from Pennsylvania
 Henry Foster (Australian politician) (1846–1902), Australian politician for electoral district of Gippsland East

Characters
Henry Foster, a character from Aldous Huxley's novel Brave New World
Henry Foster, a former character from the ITV1 soap opera Coronation Street

Others
Henry Foster (scientist) (1797–1831), British naval officer, explorer and scientist
Henry Foster (doctor), failed nominee to the position of Surgeon General of the United States
Harry Foster (cricketer) (1873–1950), British cricketer, real name: Henry
Henry Foster (clergyman), founding member of the Eclectic Society
Henry Foster, founder of Charles River Laboratories and father of the company's current chairman and CEO, James C. Foster

See also
Henry Foster Adams (1882–1973), psychologist and writer
Harry Foster (disambiguation) 
Henry Forster (disambiguation)